The 1997–98 National Summer Soccer League was the third and final season of a short-lived nationwide association football club competition in New Zealand. It was replaced in 1999 by the second incarnation of the New Zealand National Soccer League. The competition was won by Napier City Rovers.

Structure
The league was an invitation-only competition, with no promotion or relegation taking place. Seven of the teams which took part in 1997 also took part this season. Wellington United and Mount Maunganui did not participate in the 1997 season; their places were taken by Mount Wellington, Team Otago, and Lower Hutt City. Woolston WMC also did not participate, but were one of the teams represented by a composite side, Canterbury Woolston.

Matches took place between November 1997 and April 1998, with a three-week break from late December to mid-January. The competition was divided into two stages. In the first stage the eleven teams took part in a round-robin league, with each team playing every other team home and away. The top three teams from this stage progressed to a play-off series. This involved the second and third-placed teams from the league phase playing each other, with the winner meeting the league's top-placed team in the final.

The unusual points system used in the 1996 and 1997 competitions was abandoned in 1998, and was replaced by the standard system of three points for a win, one for a draw, and none for a loss.

League stage

League table

Finals

Semi-final

Final

Records and statistics

Biggest winning margin
Napier City Rovers 8, Canterbury Woolston 1
Central United 9, North Shore United 2

Highest aggregate score
Waitakere City 9, Napier City Rovers 5

References

National Summer Soccer League seasons
1998 in New Zealand association football
1997 in New Zealand association football
New Zealand
New Zealand